Shahidul Islam may refer to:

 Shahidul Islam (Lalu) (died 25 May 2009), known as Lalu, Bangladeshi freedom fighter.
 Shahidul Islam (cricketer, born 1982) (born 25 January 1982), Bangladeshi cricketer.
Sheikh Shahidul Islam, former Bangladeshi education minister.
Shahidul Islam Khokon, Bangladeshi film director.
Shahidul Islam (Mufti), Bangladeshi Politician.
Shahidul Islam (academic), Bangladesh Nationalist Party politician, MP for Kushtia-2